Kristjan Horžen (born 8 December 1999) is a Slovenian handball player who plays for Rhein-Neckar Löwen and the Slovenian national team. He represented Slovenia at the 2020 European Men's Handball Championship.

References

External links

1999 births
Living people
Sportspeople from Novo Mesto
Slovenian male handball players
Rhein-Neckar Löwen players
Expatriate handball players
Slovenian expatriate sportspeople in Germany
Handball-Bundesliga players

21st-century Slovenian people